is a Japanese former competitive figure skater. She is the 2006 Four Continents silver medalist, the 2003 Four Continents bronze medalist, the 2005–06 Grand Prix Final bronze medalist, the 2007 Asian Winter Games champion, and a three-time (2006, 2007, 2009) Japanese national bronze medalist. Nakano is one of twelve female skaters to perform a triple Axel in international competition.

Personal life
Yukari Nakano was born on August 25, 1985 in Kōnan, Aichi Prefecture. She has two elder siblings, a brother and sister.

In 2004, Nakano enrolled at Waseda University in Tokyo. She earned her master's degree from Waseda, having studied at the Graduate School of Human Sciences. In 2010, she began working for Fuji Television's Sports Division, becoming a director and journalist.

In April 2015, Nakano married her longtime boyfriend.

Career
Nakano started skating in 1991 at the Grand Prix Tokai Figure Skating Club, where Machiko Yamada was coaching. Nakano met Midori Ito there, who inspired her to take her skating seriously.

On the junior level, Nakano won two ISU Junior Grand Prix events and earned the silver medal at the 2002 World Junior Championships.

At her first senior international event, the 2002 Skate America, Nakano became the third female skater in the history of the sport to land a triple Axel in an ISU sanctioned competition, and the first to have done so in ten years. She went on to land a triple Axel-double toe loop combinations at the 2002 Japanese Nationals, the West Japan Championships 2002, and the Kanto Gakusei Freeskating Championships 2004.

Nakano won her first Grand Prix medals in her fourth season on the circuit: bronze at the 2005 Skate Canada International and gold at the 2005 NHK Trophy. She qualified for the 2005–06 Grand Prix of Figure Skating Final where she took the bronze. She landed triple Axels in five consecutive competitions in 2005 (Yamanashi Kokutai 2005, Kanto Gakusei Freeskating Championships, Tokyo Figure Skating Championships, Skate Canada International, and Asian Figure Skating Championships). At the 2005 Skate Canada, she became the first woman to land a triple Axel under the ISU Judging System in ISU Senior level competition. She placed 5th at the 2005–06 Nationals, missing a berth on the Olympic team. At the World Championships she finished 5th in 2006, 5th in 2007 and 4th in 2008.

In the 2008–09 season, Nakano won the silver medal at the 2008 Skate America and the bronze at the 2008 NHK Trophy. She qualified for the 2008–09 Grand Prix of Figure Skating Final, where she placed fifth. At the 2008–09 Japan Figure Skating Championships, Nakano led after the short program but three of her jumps were downgraded in the free skate, resulting in her placing 6th in the long program and 5th overall. She did not qualify for the 2009 world team.

At her assigned events for the 2009–10 Grand Prix series, Nakano won the bronze medal at the 2009 Trophée Eric Bompard and finished fourth at the 2009 NHK Trophy. Although she won the bronze medal at the 2009–10 Japan Championships, she was not assigned to the 2010 Olympic team; fourth-place finisher Miki Ando was awarded the first Olympic spot due to her highest placement as a Japanese female skater in the 2009–10 Grand Prix Final, along with gold and silver Japanese medalists Mao Asada and Akiko Suzuki.

Nakano retired from competitive skating in March 2010 due to an injury to her left shoulder.

Triple Axel and signature moves
In her regional competition at the beginning of the 2007–08 season, Nakano landed her first clean triple Axel in two years. She consistently attempted the triple Axel that season, receiving credit for it at the 2007 Skate Canada International, 2007 Cup of Russia, and the 2007–08 Grand Prix Final.

Nakano's signature move is the donut spin. She is also known for her leg wrap when she jumps.

Programs

Competitive highlights
GP: Grand Prix; JGP: Junior Grand Prix

Detailed results
Small medals for short program and free skating awarded only at ISU Championships.

Post–2002

Pre–2002

 QR = Qualifying round; SP = Short program; FS = Free skating

References

External links

  
 

1985 births
Japanese female single skaters
Living people
People from Kōnan, Aichi
Sportspeople from Aichi Prefecture
Four Continents Figure Skating Championships medalists
World Junior Figure Skating Championships medalists
Asian Games medalists in figure skating
Figure skaters at the 2003 Asian Winter Games
Figure skaters at the 2007 Asian Winter Games
Asian Games gold medalists for Japan
Asian Games bronze medalists for Japan
Medalists at the 2003 Asian Winter Games
Medalists at the 2007 Asian Winter Games
Universiade medalists in figure skating
Universiade gold medalists for Japan
Competitors at the 2009 Winter Universiade
Competitors at the 2005 Winter Universiade